Cynipinae is a subfamily of gall wasps (Cynipidae). Many of the approximately 1,500 described species cause galls on oaks, but some induce galls on other plant species or are inquilines of the gall-inducing species. Species occur on all continents except Antarctica, with most found in the temperate regions of the northern hemisphere. All extant cynipid species are within Cynipinae since the only other recognized subfamily is Hodiernocynipinae which is based on the fossil genus Hodiernocynips.

Tribes
There are 12 tribes currently recognized within Cynipinae:
 Aylacini
 Aulacideini
 Ceroptresini
 Cynipini (oak gall wasps)
 Diastrophini
 Diplolepidini (rose gall wasps)
 Eschatocerini
 Paraulacini
 Pediaspidini
 Phanacidini
 Qwaqwaiini
 Synergini

References 

Cynipidae

Hymenoptera subfamilies